Centennial Park may refer to:

Argentina
Parque Centenario, a public park in Buenos Aires

Australia
Centennial Park Cemetery, Pasadena and Adelaide, South Australia
Centennial Park (Sydney)
Centennial Park, New South Wales, a suburb of Sydney named for the park
Centennial Park, Western Australia, a suburb of the city of Albany

Canada
Centennial Park (Moncton), New Brunswick
Centennial Park (Thunder Bay), Ontario
Centennial Park (Toronto), either of two parks in Ontario, Canada

New Zealand
Centennial Park, Christchurch, a sports park
Centennial Park, Ngaruawahia, a sports venue
Centennial Park, Oamaru, a sports venue

United States
Centennial Park, Arizona, a hamlet in Mohave County; home to fundamentalist Mormon polygamists
Centennial Olympic Park, Atlanta, Georgia
Centennial Park (Champaign, Illinois)
Centennial Park (Davenport, Iowa)
Centennial Park (Ellicott City), Maryland
Centennial Grounds, home park for the 1875 Philadelphia Centennials baseball team in Pennsylvania
Centennial Park (Nashville), Tennessee
Centennial Park, a waterfront park connected to Myrtle Edwards Park in Seattle, Washington

In fiction
Centennial Park, a fictitious park in Metropolis in the Superman mythos